= Sinus totus =

Concept in trigonometry

In trigonometry, the sinus totus (Latin for "total sine") was historically the radius of the base circle used to construct a sine table; that is, the maximum possible value of the sine.

Letting the notation $\operatorname{Sin} \theta$ stand for the historical sine, and $\sin \theta$ stand for the modern sine function,

$$\operatorname{Sin} \theta = R \sin \theta,$$

where $R$ is the sinus totus, $R = \operatorname{Sin} 90^\circ.$
